Saint-Priest-des-Champs is a commune in the Puy-de-Dôme department in the Auvergne of central France.

The inhabitants of the commune are known as Saint-Priestois or Saint-Priestoises.

Geography
Saint-Priest-des-Champs is located some 25 km west of Combronde and 15 km north-west of Bromont-Lamothe. Access to the commune is by the D987 from Pontaumur in the south which passes through the length of the commune and the village before continuing north-east to Saint-Gervais-d'Auvergne. The D62 comes from Espinasse in the north-west and continues through the village south-east to Les Ancizes-Comps. The D515 also goes west from the village to Biollet. The D512 branches from the D987 at the south-western border of the commune and forms most of the southern border of the commune. The commune is mixed forest and farmland.

The south-eastern border of the commune is marked by the Sioule river which flows north forming a lake behind the dam just east of the commune. The north eastern border is formed by the Chalamont which flows south to join the Sioulet near the dam. The Coli rises in the west of the commune and flows east, south of the village, to join the Sioule. Many other streams rise in the commune and flow south-east to join the Sioule. Other streams rise in the west of the commune and join the Ruisseau de Coulet which flows south to join the Chevalet near Tingaud.

Localities and Hamlets

Bargheon
Beauffessoux le petit
Beauffessoux le grand
Blanquet
Bois Redon
Bois des Girauds
Boscavert
Bouchelet
Buffevent
Buige de la Roche
Carton
Champ Moise
Chez Saby
Chirol
Cluzel
Coulazède
Couronnet
Courtine
Croix de Boissis
Gandichoux
Gaulme
Grandsaigne
Jouhet
La Barge
La Buchaille
La Carte
La Chomette
Lacost
La Couaire
La Croizette
La Force
La Geneste
La Georges
La Mazière
La Motte
L'Arbre
La Reine
La Roche
La Sauvolle
Lasciouve
Laussedat
Laval
La Vergne
Lébeaupin
Le Bladeix
Le Davideix
Le Marais
Le Moulin du Bay
Le Moulin de Laval
Le Moulin de l'Étang Grand
Le Puy Gotier
Le Pradeix
Le Puy
Le Sagnard
Les Barsses
Les Chaussades
Les Chomets
Les Communaux
Les Eaux Minérales
Le Signolet
Lespadys
Les Paris
Les Pâturaux
Les Rioux
Les Sandes
Les Treux
Le Teilhot
Marcheix
Mazeron
Montpied
Pas de Saint-Martin
Pérol
Pont de Fourche
Puy de Beix
Ragheade
Retaillat
Roudadoux
Ruderre
Sous la Roche
Sous le Bois
Vernadel
Villemaine
Visignol

Neighbouring communes and villages

Administration

List of Successive Mayors

Twinning

Saint-Priest-des-Champs has twinning associations with:
 Hohentengen (Germany) since 1986.

Demography
In 2017 the commune had 702 inhabitants.

Culture and heritage

The Church of the Nativity of Saint John the Baptist
The War Memorial
Many Wayside Crosses

There is a Bourrée or dance called Bourrée de Saint-Priest (also known as Les garçons maçons). Many of these popular dance tunes, usually untitled and anonymous, have often been "renamed" in their collection, or interpretation, or the name of the collection place. There is a giate (a bourrée in triple time) in the repertoire of Jean Lecuyer, an accordion player at Saint-Priest-des-Champs.

Saint-Priest-des-Champs Picture Gallery

Facilities
There is a convenience store and a postal agency in the commune. There is an osteopath near the church.

See also
Communes of the Puy-de-Dôme department

References

External links
Website on Saint-Priest-des-Champs 
Saint-Priest-des-Champs on Géoportail, National Geographic Institute (IGN) website 
St Prieft des Champs on the 1750 Cassini Map

Saintpriestdeschamps